Renato Scarpa (14 September 1939 – 30 December 2021) was an Italian film actor. He appeared in 85 films from 1969 to 2019. 

Scarpa died on 30 December 2021, at the age of 82.

Selected filmography

 St. Michael Had a Rooster (1972)
 Don't Look Now (1973)
 Giordano Bruno (1973)
 Somewhere Beyond Love (1974)
 Piedone a Hong Kong (1975)
 Suspiria (1977)
 An Average Little Man (1977)
 Il mostro (1977)
 Bionda fragola (1980)
 Fun Is Beautiful (1980)
 Men or Not Men (1980)
 Ricomincio da tre (1981)
 Buddy Goes West (1981)
 West of Paperino (1981)
 Spaghetti House (1982)
 I'm Going to Live by Myself (1982)
 A.D. (1985)
 Via Montenapoleone (1987)
 The Icicle Thief (1989)
 Les secrets professionnels du Dr Apfelglück (1991)
 Il Postino (1994)
 Joseph (1995)
 Roseanna's Grave (1997)
 The Talented Mr. Ripley (1999)
 Esther (1999) 
 The Son's Room (2001)
 Palestrina - Prince of Music (2009)
 The Tourist (2010)
 We Have a Pope (2011)
 Diaz – Don’t Clean Up This Blood (2012)
 Santini's Network (2013)
 Tommaso (2016)

References

External links

1939 births
2021 deaths
Italian male film actors
Male actors from Milan
20th-century Italian male actors
21st-century Italian male actors